The American University of Kuwait is a private liberal arts institution based on the American model of higher education in Kuwait. Although established in 2003, the University opened to students, faculty and the general public in September 2004. It is sister colleges with Dartmouth College, in Hanover, New Hampshire. Professor Dr. Rawda Awwad currently serves the office of the President.

Campus
The AUK Campus is located in Salmiya, one of Kuwait's most cosmopolitan areas. The campus has spacious, modern classrooms; computer, science, and language laboratories; an administration building; a state-of-the-art library; and cafes, restaurants, shops, and recreation courts.

AUK offers 24-hour security service to ensure the safety of its community. Athletic facilities include tennis, basketball and volleyball courts, as well as a soccer field, and fitness center. There are also respective prayer rooms for men and women located on campus.

Faculty and staff
The American University of Kuwait has professors from Canada, US, UK, as well as Kuwait, among other parts of the world. Unique to other universities, AUK also offers a Student Worker Program, where students are hired in various departments to perform tasks from administrative work to assisting in the development of departmental missions.

Degree programs
B.B.A. in Accounting
B.B.A. in Marketing
B.B.A. in  Finance 
B.B.A. in  Management
B.B.A. in Economics
B.B.A. in Human Resource Management
B.S. in Computer Science 
B.S. in  Information Systems
B.E. in Computer Engineering
B.E. in Electrical Engineering
B.A. in Communication and Media Studies 
B.A. in English Language and Literature
B.A. in Graphic Design
B.A. in International Studies
B.A. in Social and Behavioral Sciences with a concentration in Anthropology
B.A. in Systems Engineering

See also
AUC Press
Cairo International Model United Nations
American University of Sharjah (AUS)
American University of Beirut (AUB)
American University of Iraq - Sulaimani (AUI)
American University in Dubai (AUD)

References

 
Educational institutions established in 2004
2004 establishments in Kuwait